Rånåsfoss Station is a railway station located in Rånåsfoss in Sørum, Norway on Kongsvinger Line. The station was built in 1918 as part of the Kongsvinger Line. The station is served hourly, with extra rush hour departures, by the Oslo Commuter Rail line R14 operated by Vy.

Railway stations in Sørum
Railway stations on the Kongsvinger Line
Railway stations opened in 1918
1918 establishments in Norway